The 2022 World's Strongest Man was the 45th edition of the World's Strongest Man competition, an event that took place in Sacramento, California from May 24 to May 29, 2022. The contest was won by Tom Stoltman with this being his second consecutive title. Joining him on the podium were the 2019 and 2020 World's Strongest Man winners, Martins Licis and Oleksii Novikov respectively, who tied on points. In the event of a draw, the highest placing athlete on the last event ranks higher.

Participants

Manuel Angulo, Nedžmin Ambešković and Kim Ujarak are the first representatives of Chile, Bosnia and Herzegovina and Greenland in WSM history respectively. Angulo is also the first South American athlete to compete at WSM. Before the contest began, two time runner up Mateusz Kieliszkowksi, Peiman Maheripourehir, Rauno Heinla and Pa O’Dwyer were initially contestants before withdrawing. Graham Hicks, Cheick “Iron Biby” Sanou, four time champion, Žydrūnas Savickas and regular finalist J.F Caron declined to compete.

Heat results

Format
The 30 athletes were divided into 5 groups of 6 athletes, with 2 athletes from each group progressing to the final of 10. The winner of each group progressed to the final, and 2nd and 3rd in each group would then advance to a 'Stone Off', from which the winner would also progress.

Heat 1
 Events: Loading Race, Deadlift ladder, Car walk, Log lift, Wrecking ball hold.

Stone Off

Originally, Ireland's Pa O'Dwyer was supposed to be in this group, but was forced to withdraw due to injury, and was replaced by Scotland's Andy Black. Defending World's Strongest Man Tom Stoltman would dominate this group, winning each of the first 4 events, before simply picking up the wrecking ball to get 1 point, and secure the group win. Canada's Strongest Man and WSM rookie Gabriel Rhéaume would cause an upset, knocking out former finalist Faires in the stone off, despite Faires being 4 points clear.

Heat 2
 Events: Loading Race, Deadlift ladder, Car walk, Log lift, Wrecking ball hold.

Stone Off

Considered the group of death when announced, this group featured 4-time World's Strongest Man and 2021 runner up Brian Shaw, 2 more finalists from 2021, Bobby Thompson and Konstantine Janashia, Mark Felix in his record 17th WSM contest, Gabriel Pena, and rookie Mitchell Hooper. Hooper stunned everyone, winning the first 3 events, before placing joint second on the log lift, meaning he needed just 1 point from the wrecking ball hold to secure the group win. In the stone off, Bobby Thompson had some problems with his tacky, and failed to lift the stone once, handing the win, and second qualifying spot to Shaw. It was the first time since 2009 that Shaw failed to win his group at WSM.

Heat 3
 Events: Loading Race, Deadlift ladder, Car walk, Log lift, Wrecking ball hold.

Stone Off

This group featured 2020 Champion Oleksii Novikov, 2021 4th place finisher Trey Mitchell, 3 time finalist Adam Bishop, Rob Kearney, rookie Mika Törrö, and Poland's Grzegorz Szymanski, returning to the competition for the first time since 2016, where he made the final. In what was the best performing group across all events, Novikov came out on top, returning to the final after missing the 2021 final, and Trey Mitchell won on the stone off, despite Bishop doing more reps than any other group.

Heat 4
 Events: Loading Race, Deadlift ladder, Car walk, Log lift, Wrecking ball hold.

Stone Off

This group featured 2019 champion Martins Licis, 2021 podium finisher Maxime Boudreault, 2 time UK's Strongest Man Gavin Bilton, and 3 rookies. Unfortunately, Shane Flowers was forced to withdraw after 2 events due to injury. Licis would come out on top, with Boudreault coming through on the stones for the second year running.

Heat 5
 Events: Loading Race, Deadlift ladder, Car walk, Log lift, Wrecking ball hold.

Stone Off

The only group without a former champion, it featured Evan Singleton and Luke Stoltman, both of whom had won 2 Giants Live events in 2021, as well as 2021 finalist Eythor Ingolfsson Melsted, and 3 rookies. Unfortunately for Singleton, he went into anaphylactic shock during the loading race, and was forced to miss the deadlift. This put him in an almost irrecoverable position going into day 2 of the heats, and despite winning the car walk, was unable to even make the stone off. Stoltman would win the group with an event to spare, and Melsted would get through on the stones to make a second straight final.

Finals events results

Event 1: KNAACK Giant's Medley
 Weight: 2 x  boxes,  yoke carry
 Course Length:  each

Event 2: Car Deadlift
 Weight:  for repetitions
 Time Limit: 60 seconds

Event 3: Max Flintstone Lift
 Opening Weight:

Event 4: Bus Pull
 Weight: 
 Course Length: 
 Time Limit: 75 seconds

Event 5: REIGN Power Stairs
 Weight: 3 x 
 Course Length: 3 steps each
 Time Limit: 75 seconds

Event 6: Atlas Stones
 Weight: 5 stones ranging from 
 Time Limit: 60 seconds

Final standings

Controversy
A day prior to the competition, former director for World's Ultimate Strongman, Mark Boyd, leaked a secretly recorded portion of a conversation with Luke Stoltman, brother of the eventual champion of the competition Tom Stoltman, in which he stated "... and here's the sneaky bit, so Colin's (Colin Bryce, director of Giants Live who assists in the running of the World's Strongest Man) gonna, not promised, but he says we will get more favorable groups, events, etc. in Worlds if we kinda play ball and then he can help push the Stoltman brand; if that makes sense in the Giant's Live, so basically what he did for Eddie (Eddie Hall)..." The audio was released shortly after the groups for the competition were announced, with some fans speculating on the level of difficulty of the Stoltmans' groups compared to others. Boyd has since deleted this video from his Instagram account. Prior to deletion however, he claims to have given several months for athletes to expose the corruption on their own, indicating that he also had contacted IGM directors to no avail. 

Stoltman released his own response video on YouTube later that day, in which he states that the clip was taken out of context, with the conversation being 90 minutes long, and explains that he simply told Boyd what he wanted to hear because he did not want to take part in Boyd's upcoming competition. Many took issue with Boyd's leaking of the conversation so closely to the World's Strongest Man competition date, leading to Boyd and Core Sports parting ways a few days later, with the company releasing a message stating they were not in support of Boyd's actions. 

At the current moment, IGM, the World's Strongest Man, and Colin Bryce have not yet responded to the controversy.

References

External links
 The World's Strongest Man official website

 

World's Strongest Man